The Lackawanna Coal Mine is a museum and retired coal mine located in McDade Park in Scranton, Pennsylvania.

History 
The Lackawanna Coal Mine was opened by Continental Coal Company in 1903. Lackawanna County, including Scranton, is part of the Northern Field of the coal region of Pennsylvania and many Europeans immigrated to the area to work in the mines.

The mine was closed in 1966 and lay abandoned until 1978 when the mine was converted to a museum, supported by $2.5 million in federal money. Restoration included removal of debris, laying track for a mine car to carry visitors into the mine, installation of electricity for lights, and reinforcing of the shafts with steel buttresses. The museum opened in 1985.

In 1987, Lackawanna County received a $300,000 state grant to build a  museum building to house exhibits and artifacts. The addition is called the Shifting Shanty, a name used to describe the area where miners showered after a shift.

Adjacent to the mine tour is the Pennsylvania Anthracite Heritage Museum with exhibits on Northeastern Pennsylvania's mining and industrial history. The museum is run by Lackawanna County.

Museum tour
The purpose of the mine is to give visitors a feeling for what it was like to work in an underground mine. The tours are led by former miners, or children of miners.

The tour proceeds, on foot, through several twisting veins of the abandoned mine. During the tour, the tour guides describe various aspects of the anthracite mining industry in Pennsylvania including the file of the fire boss, air doors and their role in ventilation, door boys or nippers, second means of exit from the mine, and the company store.

In popular culture

The Lackawanna Coal Mine is featured in seasons 3 and 4 of the television adaptation of The Man in the High Castle where is it is depicted as having an artificial portal to parallel worlds.

In season 1 of The Office Michael Scott is seen attempting to organize a field trip for his office to the museum under the assumption that the elevator that takes visitors down into the mine is a ride analogous to a roller-coaster drop instead of the slow and prolonged descent into an industrial coal mining facility that it actually was.

References

External links

Museums in Scranton, Pennsylvania
Mining museums in Pennsylvania
Coal mines in the United States
Mines in Pennsylvania
Former mines in the United States
Former coal mines
Coal museums in the United States